Edna Lee Booker was an American journalist who authored several books about China during the 1930s and 1940s.

Career
She arrived in Shanghai in 1922 as foreign correspondent for the International News Service of New York City and as, in her own words, a "girl reporter" for the China Press, then the leading American daily in China. She had previously worked on the Los Angeles Herald and the San Francisco Call-Bulletin, and became the first foreign woman correspondent ever to interview the two Chinese warlords, Zhang Zuolin and Wu Pei-fu.

Family
Booker was married to her husband John Potter who was a businessman. Together they raised their family in Shanghai while the Japanese invaded and occupied China. Just days before the relocation of citizens to Japanese internment camps, Booker and her children fled to the United States. However, her husband was interned for years. Her daughter, Patricia Luce Chapman, wrote a memoir of the family's China years entitled "Tea On The Great Wall," published in 2014.

Works
News is my job; a correspondent in war-torn China. 1940. New York, The Macmillan Company. 
Flight from China. with John S. Potter. Decorations by Peggy Bacon. 1945. New York, The Macmillan Company.

See also
Agnes Smedley
Anna Louise Strong

References

External links

Year of birth missing
Year of death missing
American newspaper reporters and correspondents
American women journalists
20th-century American women writers
20th-century American non-fiction writers